Alopoglossus viridiceps, known commonly as the green-headed shade lizard, is a species of lizard in the family Alopoglossidae. The species is endemic to Ecuador.

Etymology
The specific name, viridiceps, is from Latin viridis (green) + ceps (head), referring to the green coloration of the head, both dorsally and ventrally.

Geographic range
A. viridisceps is found in the Andes of Ecuador in Pichincha Province.

References

Further reading
Arteaga A, Pyron RA, Peñafiel N, Romero-Barreto P, Culebras J, Bustamante L, Yánez-Muñoz MH, Guayasamin JM (2016). "Comparative Phylogeography Reveals Cryptic Diversity and Repeated Patterns of Cladogenesis for Amphibians and Reptiles in northwestern Ecuador ". PLoS ONE 11 (4): e0151746. 
Torres-Carvajal O, Lobos SE (2014). "A new species of Alopoglossus lizard (Squamata, Gymnophthalmidae) from the tropical Andes, with a molecular phylogeny of the genus". ZooKeys 410: 105–120. (Alopoglossus viridiceps, new species). (in English, with an abstract in Spanish).

Alopoglossus
Reptiles of Ecuador
Endemic fauna of Ecuador
Reptiles described in 2014
Taxa named by Omar Torres-Carvajal
Taxa named by Simón E. Lobos